Chellapilla is an Indian surname. Belong to Aaraama Dravidulu of the Telugu Brahmins. They are primarily categorized as the Saiva Brahmins or followers of Shiva.

 Chellapilla Satyam, Indian film music director
 Chellapilla Venkata Sastry, one the poet duo Tirupati Venkata Kavulu
 Chellapilla Venkata Rao, Indian botanist (1910-1971) However, Rao appears to be his surname.
Chellapilla Vidyadhar,
Famous Indian American software developer 
 Chellapilla Rajagopala Rao, Head Master in Parvathipuram. He is cousin of Music Director Satyam. Both are born and brought up in Gunanupuram. He is also revered as a great person for giving away thousands of acres of land to the poor and needy.

Surnames of Indian origin